Taxation in Italy is levied by the central and regional governments and is collected by the Italian Agency of Revenue (Agenzia delle Entrate). Total tax revenue in 2018 was 42,4% of GDP.  Most important earnings are: income tax, social security, corporate tax and value added tax.  All of those are collected at national level, but some of those differs across regions. Personal income taxation in Italy is progressive.

Income tax
Employment income is subject to a progressive income tax, IRPEF (Imposta sul reddito delle persone fisiche) applying to all workers. By government is set tax rate according to income, but the regions can add an additional 0.7% to 3.33%. Each region not only has a regional income tax, a municipal income tax can be levied which ranges from 0.1% to 0.9%. Municipalities can also establish progressive tax rates applicable to the national income bracket.

In 2018, the personal income tax rates were as follows:

Individuals are considered resident for tax purposes if for the greater part of the tax year they satisfy any of the following conditions:

 their habitual abode is in Italy,
 the centre of their vital interests is located in Italy, or
 they are registered at the Office of Records of the Resident Population in Italy.

Exemption Area
Due to the different types of income, exemption from IRPEF is determined at:

8,000 euros, for subordinate workers, if their employment period coincides with the entire year;
7,500 euros, for pensioners under 75 years of age, if the pension is cashed in for the entire year, and for those receiving palimony from ex spouses;
7,750 euros, for pensioners aged 75 or older, with a pension period that coincides with the whole year;
4,800 euros, no matter how many days they work a year, for taxpayers with other types of income.
The area exempt from IRPEF increases further if there are dependent family members.

New residents of Italy are subject to a more favourable tax treatment on income taxes, providing they were not tax resident of Italy in the past 24 months. Any taxpayer is entitled a 70% exemption on the employment or self-employment income received for the first 5 years of tax residency to Italy; the exemption is increased to 90% if the taxpayer resides in a Southern region of Italy.
The regime is extended of further 5 years if the taxpayer meets any of the following conditions:
 has a family dependent of 18 years of age or less living in Italy
 purchases a residential property in Italy

Corporate tax
Italian corporate entities are subject to Corporate Income Tax, IRES (Imposta sul reddito delle società) and to Regional Production Tax, IRAP (Imposta regionale sulle attività produttive). Italy has one of the highest corporate tax - currently at 24% - across EU28, average tax in EU is 21.3% (2018) and is still decreasing, however, Italy has after elections in March 2018 stop depreciation. 

The rate of corporate income tax (IRES) since 1 January 2017 is 24% (previously it was 27.5%, maximum 53.2% in 1981). Some corporations are exempted from corporate tax, such as charitable foundations, church institutions and sports clubs.
The standard rate of regional tax (IRAP) is 3.9%, however, regional authorities may increase or decrease rate of standard tax by up to 0.92%. In addition, different IRAP rates are used to differ sectors of the economy in each region. For example, the rate for banks and other financial institutions is 5.57% in Abruzzo, Apulia, Lazio, Lombardy, Piedmont and Veneto, but only 4.65% in Emilia-Romagna). The tax is calculated differently from IRES, adding the cost of fixed-term workers (before 2016 the cost of every employee was counted). Up to 10% of regional tax (IRAP) is deductible in calculating the tax base for corporate income tax (IRES) purposes.

Value added tax
Value added tax or shortcut VAT, (in Italian Imposta sul valore aggiunto, shortcut IVA) is a consumption tax charged at a standard rate of 22%, which came in on 1 July 2013 (previously 21%)

The first reduced VAT rate (10%) applies to water supplies, passenger transport, admission to cultural and sports events, hotels, restaurants, some foodstuff.

The second reduced VAT rate (5%) applies to some foodstuff, social services.

The super-reduced VAT rate (4%) applies to TV licenses, newspapers, periodicals, books, medical equipment for the disabled.

A zero rate (0%) applies to intra-community and international transport.

The filing deadline for VAT returns is 30 April of the next year.

Social security

Employment relationship (staff) 
Social security contributions apply to everyone in the workforce, divided into contributions by the employer and those by the employee; both sides are obliged to participate. Employers must register with the Italian Social Security Administration (Istituto Nazionale Previdenza Sociale or INPS). The total contribution rate fluctuates around 40% of the employee's wage, depending on their position in the company, on the number of employees in the company, and on the industrial sector of the company. Usually the contributions are apportioned as follows:

 around 30% is charged to the employer
 around 10% is charged to the employee

However, only 33% out of this 40% is used for INPS purposes; the rest is distributed into several other funds:

 Unemployment fund
 Sickness fund - usage of this fund is not applicable for executives
 Maternity fund
 Temporary unemployment compensation fund - separates into ordinary and extraordinary compensation fund, usage of this fund is not applicable for executives
 Social mobility fund - usage of this fund is not applicable for executives
 Other minor funds

The social security contribution, for employees who registered with INPS after 1 January 1996 without a previous social security position in Italy, is calculated and paid up to a maximum amount of EUR 101,427 for the year 2018.

Employment relationship (executive) 
Social contributions due from executives:

commercial executive has to contribute following 

 For INPS tax level is 9.19% of income up to income ceiling of amount €46,630. For higher income tax level is set to be 10.19% of income.
 For Fondo Mario Negri - complementary pension fund tax level is 1% on a national annual income, tax ceiling is €59,224.54 and maximally €129.12 yearly as training charges.
 For Fondo Mario Besusso - also known as FASDAC (Fondo Assistenza Sanitaria Dirigenti Aziende Commerciali) - national medical fund, tax level is 1.87% of annual income with yearly maximum €45,940. 
 For Fondo Pastore - complementary pension fund - it's required to contribute at least €464.81. This fund consist of insurance and investment (not compulsory).

industrial executive has to contribute following 

 For INPS tax level is 9.19% of income up to income ceiling of amount €46,630. For higher income tax level is set to be 10.19% of income.
 For Fondo Assistenza Sanitaria Industria or FASI - medical care fund - is set flat rate at level of €960.
 For Fondo Previdenza Dirienti Aziende industriali or PREVINDAI - additional pension fund - is set tax level 4% of income only for those with maximum annual income €150,000.

Self-employment relationship 
For self-employed individuals who are not VAT number holders and are not covered by compulsory private pension fund is instituted law 335/95, according to this individuals must register with INPS in a "separate social security regime". This system is provided for three different rates.

 For individuals enrolled in other mandatory security regime is tax level 24% of annual income.
 For individuals with VAT number enrolled in exclusive way into Gestione separata INPS (separate social security regime) is tax level 25.72%.
All others individuals enrolled in the exclusive way into the separate social security regime (Gestione separata INPS) differs on providing DIS-COLL. If DIS-COLL is not provided, tax rate is 33.72% of income, if DIS-COLL is provided, tax rate is 34.23%.

All percentages equals to maximal limit of €101,427 established by law in 2017.

Other taxes

Wealth tax on real estate properties owned outside of Italy 
The Italian wealth tax on real estate properties (Imposta sul valore degli immobile situati all’estero or IVIE) owned outside of Italy by an individual who qualifies as a resident for Italian tax purposes has been introduced in Italy. The wealth tax due is proportionate to the percentage owned and the size of the property. The applicable tax rate is equal to 0.76%.No IVIE is due if the tax is lower than EUR 200; otherwise, the entire IVIE amount is due.

Wealth tax on financial investments owned outside of Italy 
The Italian wealth tax on financial investments (Imposta sul valore delle Attivita` Finanziarie detenute all` Estero or IVAFE) owned outside of Italy by an individual who qualifies as a resident for Italian tax purposes has been introduced in Italy. The wealth tax due is proportionate to the percentage owned and the size of the property. The applicable tax rate is equal to 0.2% for FY 2018. Only for bank accounts, the above-mentioned tax is a flat amount equal to EUR 34.20 for each bank account. This flat amount is not due if the average saving amount is lower than EUR 5,000, taking into consideration all the bank accounts owned by the taxpayer.

Inheritance, estate, and gift taxes 
A tax on inheritance and donations was reintroduced in October 2006 after a five year period during which this tax was abolished. The percentage and exemption limits applicable to transfers of money or assets depend on the beneficiary's relation with the deceased person or donor.

 the spouse or relatives in a direct line, the inheritance or donations tax will be imposed at 4% on the value of the assets exceeding the tax-free threshold of EUR 1 million (per heir)
 a sister and brother, the inheritance or donations tax will be imposed at 6% on the value of the transfer exceeding EUR 100,000 (per heir)
 other family members up to the fourth generation, the inheritance or donations tax will be imposed at a 6% tax rate on the entire value of the transfer, and
 all other beneficiaries not previously mentioned will be subject to an 8% tax rate to be applied on the entire value of the transfer.

Specific provisions apply to a handicapped person.

Regional tax on productivity 
The regional tax on productivity (IRAP) is applied at a flat rate up to 3.9%. This flat rate is applicable to the productive activity exercised. The taxable base is the difference between the compensation received and the direct business expenses, excluding any cost of personnel and interest.

Municipal taxes on real estate owned in Italy 
The Italian Financial Bill for FY 2014 has introduced relevant changes to the municipal tax on real estate owned in Italy. Indeed, the tax law has introduced a 'unique municipal tax' (Imposta municipale unica or IUC).

IUC is composed of three different taxes:

 Municipal tax (Imposta municipale propria or IMU).
 Garbage tax (Imposta sui rifiuti or TARI).
 Indivisible service tax (Imposta sui servizi indivisibili or TASI).

Tax evasion and lack of guarantees 
Italy has the largest number of "major tax evaders" in Europe, counting, according to the estimated figures, tax evasion for over €180 billion. On the other hand, evasion is sometimes seen by evaders as the best way to ensure the right of defense from the alleged excessive tax claim of the State.

See also
Eight per thousand

References